"Pierrot" is a short poem written by the African-American author Langston Hughes.  It was first published in the anthology The Weary Blues in 1926.  In 30 lines, it describes contrasts the characters of Simple John, who adheres to an ethic of hard work and traditional virtues, and Pierrot, who leads a Dionysian and carefree life.  In the end, Pierrot runs away with John's wife.

Text

I work all day,
Said Simple John,
Myself a house to buy.
I work all day,
Said Simple John,
But Pierrot wondered why.
For Pierrrot loved the long white road,
And Pierrot loved the moon,
And Pierrot loved a star-filled sky,
And the breath of a rose in June.
I have one wife,
Said Simple John,
And,faith,I love her yet.
I have one wife,
Said Simple John,
But Pierrot left Pierrette.

For Pierrot saw a world of girls,
And Pierrot loved each one,
And Pierrot thought all maidens fair
As flowers in the sun.
Oh, I am good,
Said Simple John,
The Lord will take me in.
Yes, I am good,
Said Simple John,
But Pierrot's steeped in sin.
For Pierrot played on a slim guitar,
And Pierrot loved the moon,
And Pierrot ran down the long white road
With the burgher's wife one June.

References
The Collected Poems of Langston Hughes. ed. Arnold Rampersad. New York: Alfred A. Knopf. 1997.

 

1926 poems
American poems
Poetry by Langston Hughes
African-American poetry